Mysteriet på Greveholm: Grevens återkomst ("The Mystery of the Count's Islet: The Return of the Count") was the Sveriges Television's Christmas calendar in 2012.

Plot 
The series is a following up-story to the 1996 calendar Mysteriet på Greveholm, set 16 years later, when a new family has moved into the castle.

Video 
The series was released to DVD on 13 February 2013.

References

External links 
 

2012 Swedish television series debuts
2012 Swedish television series endings
Sveriges Television's Christmas calendar